John Chambers (30 October 1930 – 12 September 2017) was an Australian cricketer. He played 27 first-class cricket matches for Victoria between 1950 and 1955.

See also
 List of Victoria first-class cricketers

References

External links
 

1930 births
2017 deaths
Australian cricketers
Victoria cricketers
Cricketers from Geelong